
William John Richardson, S.J. (2 November 1920 – 10 December 2016) was an American philosopher, who was among the first to write a comprehensive study of the philosophy of Martin Heidegger, featuring an important preface by Heidegger himself. In addition to his specialization in Heidegger, Richardson was also, as a trained psychoanalyst, a specialist in the thought of Jacques Lacan. He was a Jesuit priest (entering the order on 14 August 1941, he was ordained a priest on 15 August 1953). He taught philosophy at Fordham University and, beginning in 1981, at Boston College, where he was, at the time of his death, emeritus professor of philosophy. He died in December 2016 in Weston, Massachusetts at the age of 96.

Bibliography
Heidegger: Through Phenomenology to Thought. Preface by Martin Heidegger. The Hague: Martinus Nijhoff Publishers, 1963; 4th Edition: Fordham University Press, 2003. ; .
(With John P. Muller) Lacan and Language, Reader's Guide to Ecrits. New York: International Universities Press, 1982. 
 
(With John P. Muller) The Purloined Poe, Lacan, Derrida & Psychoanalytic Reading. Baltimore, London: Johns Hopkins University Press, 1988. 
(With John P. Muller), Ouvrir les Écrits de Lacan, adapté par P. Julien. Toulouse: Eres, 1987. 
Heidegger : Through Phenomenology to Thought. Preface by Martin Heidegger. Fortieth Anniversary Edition, with New Writer's Preface and Epilogue. New York: Fordham University Press, 2003.

See also
 List of American philosophers

References

Further references
Babette Babich (ed.) From Phenomenology to Thought, Errancy, and Desire : Essays in Honor of William J. Richardson, S.J.. Dordrecht: Kluwer, 1995.
Richard M. Capobianco.  Engaging Heidegger.  Foreword by William J. Richardson.  University of Toronto Press, 2010, softcover 2011.

External links
 Richardson's web page at Boston College
 "On Heidegger to Lacan" An Interview with William J. Richardson

1920 births
2016 deaths
20th-century American philosophers
20th-century American Jesuits
21st-century American Jesuits
Boston College faculty
Heidegger scholars
Christian continental philosophers and theologians
Jesuit philosophers